Homaloxestis grabia is a moth in the family Lecithoceridae. It was described by Chun-Sheng Wu and Kyu-Tek Park in 1999. It is found in Sri Lanka.

The wingspan is 10–12 mm. The forewings are ochreous brown, without pattern and the hindwings are light ochreous to brown.

Etymology
The species name is derived from Greek grabion (meaning torch).

References

Moths described in 1999
Homaloxestis